This is a list of the National Register of Historic Places listings in Capitol Reef National Park.

This is intended to be a complete list of the properties and districts on the National Register of Historic Places in Capitol Reef National Park, Utah, United States.  The locations of National Register properties and districts for which the latitude and longitude coordinates are included below, may be seen in a Google map.

There are ten properties and districts listed on the National Register in the park.

Current listings 

|}

See also 
 National Register of Historic Places listings in Wayne County, Utah
 National Register of Historic Places listings in Garfield County, Utah
 National Register of Historic Places listings in Utah

References 
Brower, Benjamin; McKoy, Kathy. National Register of Historic Places Multiple Property Documentation Form: Capitol Reef National Park Multiple Property Documentation Form. National Park Service March 15, 1996 

Capitol Reef National Park